The Portuguese Canoe Federation is the governing body of canoeing in Portugal. It organizes the Portuguese representation at international competitions and the Portuguese National Championships of Canoe sprint, Canoe slalom, Wildwater canoeing, Canoe marathon, Canoe Polo and Canoe freestyle.

The Federation was formed on 10 May 1979 in Portugal. It became a member of the International Canoe Federation and of the European Canoe Association in 1980.

List of medalists at the canoe sprint main international competitions

European Games 
Fernando Pimenta is the only portuguese canoeist who won medals at the first edition of the European Games in 2015.

European Championships 
A total of 9 canoeists won 27 medals for Portugal at the Canoe Sprint European Championships. Fernando Pimenta is the best portuguese canoeist with 16 medals, 11 in individual events, more than half of the medals won by Portugal.

References

National members of the European Canoe Association
Canoeing
1979 establishments in Portugal
Canoeing in Portugal